Peterswald may refer to:

 Peterswald, the German name for Petrovice (Ústí nad Labem District), a village in Ústí nad Labem District, Czech Republic
 Peterswald, the German name for Petřvald (Karviná District), a town in Karviná District, Czech Republic

 William John Peterswald, South Australian Commissioner of Police